Lynton Stott (born 9 May 1971) is an English former professional rugby league footballer who played in the 1990s and 2000s. He played at club level for both the original, and the present incarnation of the Sheffield Eagles. He also played for the Wakefield Trinity Wildcats, Doncaster, Workington Town and Hull Kingston Rovers.

Background
Stott was born in Newton-le-Willows, St. Helens, Merseyside, England.

Lynton Stott runs the Bradford Bulls Lottery, 'The Big One'.

Challenge Cup Final appearances
Lynton Stott was as an  interchange/substitute in Sheffield Eagles' 17-8 victory over Wigan in the 1998 Challenge Cup Final during Super League III at Wembley Stadium, London on Saturday 2 May 1998.

References

External links
(archived by archive.is) Australian Tour Of Europe 1994 Details
Tuigamala puts Eagles to flight
Super League: Sheffield Eagles 1997
Super League: Sheffield Eagles 1998
Wakefield Trinity Wildcats 24 Wigan Warriors 60
1999 RUGBY LEAGUE: TEAM-BY-TEAM GUIDE TO SUPER LEAGUE
Weston proves too clever for St Gaudens
St Helens settle Trindall case and challenge Leicester to a match
Baldwin's lead in Leigh rout
Rovers reached next week's major semi-final with a dramatic 30-26 victory over Rochdale at Spotland
Hull KR shock Salford
(archived by web.archive.org) Hull KR V Batley Bulldogs
(archived by archive.is) Doncaster Dragons V Hull KR
(archived by web.archive.org) Sheffield Eagles Club History
Bulls Fans Urged To Help Find The Next Sam Burgess
Season Ticket Holder Scoops £2,000
(archived by web.archive.org) Super League Trophy
(archived by archive.is) Lightning Presentation Event

1971 births
Living people
Doncaster R.L.F.C. players
English rugby league players
Hull Kingston Rovers players
People from Newton-le-Willows
Rugby league centres
Rugby league fullbacks
Rugby league players from St Helens, Merseyside
Rugby league wingers
Sheffield Eagles (1984) players
Sheffield Eagles players
Wakefield Trinity players
Workington Town players